Carinigera is a genus of gastropods belonging to the family Clausiliidae.

The species of this genus are found in Mediterranean.

Species:

Carinigera albicosta 
Carinigera buresi 
Carinigera calabacensis 
Carinigera chelidromia 
Carinigera dextrorsa 
Carinigera drenovoensis 
Carinigera eximia 
Carinigera leucorhaphe 
Carinigera liebegottae 
Carinigera lophauchena 
Carinigera octava 
Carinigera pellucida 
Carinigera praecipua 
Carinigera praestans 
Carinigera schuetti 
Carinigera septima 
Carinigera stussineri 
Carinigera superba 
Carinigera tantilla 
Carinigera thessalonica 
Carinigera torifera

References

Clausiliidae